Sir William Browne (c.1564 – 11 March 1637) of Chichester, Sussex and Walcott, Northamptonshire was an English politician who sat in the House of Commons between 1614 and 1622. 

Browne was eldest son of John Browne of Kirdford, Sussex. He matriculated from Trinity College, Cambridge at Easter 1579. He was possibly admitted at Inner Temple in November 1579. In 1614, he was elected Member of Parliament for Haslemere. He was re-elected MP for Haslemere in 1621.

References

1560s births
1637 deaths
Alumni of Trinity College, Cambridge
Members of the Inner Temple
English MPs 1614
English MPs 1621–1622